The International Conference on Computational Intelligence Methods for Bioinformatics and Biostatistics (CIBB) is a yearly scientific conference focused on machine learning and computational intelligence applied to bioinformatics and biostatistics.

Organization and history
The CIBB conferences are typically organized by members of the IEEE Computational Intelligence Society (IEEE CIS) and the International Neural Network Society (INNS), among others. Their main themes are machine learning, data mining, and computational intelligence algorithms applied to biological and biostatistical problems.

The CIBB conference was originally started by Francesco Masulli (Università di Genova), Antonina Starita (Università di Pisa), and Roberto Tagliaferri (Università di Salerno) as a special session within other international conferences held in Italy: the 14th Italian Workshop on Neural Networks (2004), the 6th International Workshop on Fuzzy Logic and Applications (2005), the 7th International Fuzzy Logic and Intelligent Technologies in Nuclear Science Conference on Applied Artificial Intelligence (2006), and the 7th International Workshop on Fuzzy Logic and Applications (2007). Because of the broad participation of researchers to the CIBB special session at the latter meeting, which included twenty-six submitted papers, the CIBB steering committee decided to turn CIBB into an autonomous conference starting with the 2008 edition in Vietri sul Mare, Italy.

During their first editions, the CIBB conferences were organized and attended mainly by Italian researchers at various academic locations throughout Italy. As international audience and importance of the conference grew, following editions moved outside Italy. The 2012 CIBB conference was held for the first time outside Europe, in Houston, Texas.

Format
The conference is a single track meeting that includes invited talks as well as oral and poster presentations of refereed papers. It usually lasts three days in September, and traditionally includes some special sessions about the application of computational intelligence to specific aspects of biology (for example, the "Special session on machine learning in health informatics and biological systems" at CIBB 2018,) and occasionally some tutorials.

At the 2011 conference edition in Gargnano, the scientific committee gave a young researcher best paper award.

Publications
Proceedings of the conferences are published as a book series by Springer Science+Business Media, whereas selected papers are published in journals such as BMC Bioinformatics.

References

External links

CIBB conference series on WikiCfp.com

Artificial intelligence conferences
Computer science conferences
Bioinformatics